Darran Lindsay (1971–2006) was a Northern Irish motorcycle road racer. He was killed on 9 September 2006 in practice for the Killalane road races, near Dublin. It is understood that his 600cc machine was in collision with another bike. He lived on the Dundrod Circuit. He was married to Kerry, and leaves three young children.

He had a reasonably successful career, winning 2 Manx Grand Prix races, 1 North West 200 race in 2005, Ulster Grand Prix races, and had 4 Irish National Championships. He had been racing since 1990.

References

External links
Darran Lindsay - A RealRoadRacing.Com Tribute

1971 births
2006 deaths
People from County Antrim
Motorcycle racers from Northern Ireland
Manx Grand Prix racers
Motorcycle racers who died while racing
Sport deaths in the Republic of Ireland